Abdelkader Chentouf is a Moroccan judge specialising in terrorism-related affairs. He has been involved in some highly controversial cases such as the Abdelkader Belliraj affair, Ali Aarrass and more recently the imprisonment and subsequent release of journalist Ali Anouzla.

References

21st-century Moroccan judges
Living people
People from Casablanca
Year of birth missing (living people)
Place of birth missing (living people)